Anastreblotis is a genus of moth in the family Gelechiidae. It contains the species Anastreblotis calycopa, which is found on Samoa.

References

Gelechiinae
Taxa named by Edward Meyrick
Monotypic moth genera
Moths of Oceania